The triangle of reference (also known as the triangle of meaning and the semiotic triangle) is a model of how linguistic symbols relate to the objects they represent. The triangle was published in The Meaning of Meaning (1923) by Charles Kay Ogden and I. A. Richards.  While often referred to as the "Ogden/Richards triangle", the idea was also expressed in 1810 by Bernard Bolzano, in his Beiträge zu einer begründeteren Darstellung der Mathematik. The triangle can be traced back to 4th century BC, in Aristotle's Peri Hermeneias. The Triangle relates to the problem of universals, a philosophical debate which split ancient and medieval philosophers, especially realists and nominalists.

The triangle describes a simplified form of relationship between the speaker as the subject, a concept as an object or referent, and its designation (sign, signans).

Interlocutory applications

Other triangles 
The relations between the triangular corners may be phrased more precisely in causal terms thus:

 The matter evokes the writer's thought.
 The writer refers the matter to the symbol.
 The symbol evokes the reader's thought.
 The reader refers the symbol back to the matter.

The communicative stand
The triangle represents one person, whereas communication takes place between two entities; the latter can be represented by two triangles. When the two entities understand each other, the content that the triangles represent is aligned.

Direction of fit 

John Searle used the notion of "direction of fit" to create a taxonomy of illocutionary acts.

The arrows indicate that there is something exchanged between the two parties in a feedback cycle, especially when the world is represented in both persons' minds and used for reality check.

See also 
 Direction of fit
 The Delta Factor 
 De dicto
 De se
 De re

References

External links 
 Jessica Erickstad (1998) Richards' Meaning of Meaning Theory. University of Colorado at Boulder.
 Allie Cahill (1998) "Proper Meaning Superstition" (I. A. Richards). University of Colorado at Boulder.

Semiotics
Semantics
Pragmatics
Philosophy of language
Philosophy of mind